List of cathedrals in Ukraine and cathedral temples that includes temples that used to have cathedra.

All of the Russian Orthodox Church temples in Ukraine are organized as the Ukrainian Orthodox Church. Since 1992 there has been a movement to organize a separate Ukrainian Orthodox Church led by self organized Kyiv Patriarch. For disambiguation purposes the Russian Orthodox Church is identified as the Ukrainian Orthodox Church (Moscow Patriarchate), and other the Ukrainian Orthodox Church (Kyiv Patriarchate).

The Russian Orthodox Church continues to possess the highest number of dioceses and major temples in Ukraine. Many of the  dioceses were created after the fall of the Soviet Union in 2000s and later.

Main cathedrals of confessions

Cathedrals of the Ukrainian Orthodox Church (Moscow Patriarchate)

Cathedrals of the Ukrainian Orthodox Church (Kyiv Patriarchate) 

Notes:
 Church of the Intercession of Theotokos in Lutsk temporarily serves as a cathedral temple of the Volyn eparchy.
 Church of the Saint Hieromartyr George the Victory-bearer in Lviv temporarily serves as a cathedral temple of the Lviv eparchy.

Additional cathedrals

Ukrainian Orthodox Church (Moscow Patriarchate)
Cathedrals of the Ukrainian Orthodox Church (Moscow Patriarchate):
 Birth of Christ Cathedral in Berdyansk
Peter and Paul Cathedral in Luhansk 
 St. Basil's Co-Cathedral in Izmail
St. Basil's Cathedral in Sarny
St. Basil's Co-Cathedral in Okhtyrka 
St. Basil's Cathedral in Khmelnytskyi

Ukrainian Orthodox Church of the Kyivan Patriarchate
Cathedrals of the Ukrainian Orthodox Church of the Kyivan Patriarchate:
Holy Trinity Cathedral in Lutsk 
Transfiguration Cathedral in Donetsk
Cathedral of St. Paul Konyushkevych and Assumption of Virgin Mary in Sambir 
St. Michael's Cathedral in Zhitomir
Holy Trinity Cathedral in Zaporozhye
Cathedral of St. Andrew in Kropyvnytskyi 
Holy Protection Cathedral in Lviv 
Cathedral of the Nativity in Odesa
Holy Resurrection Cathedral in Pereiaslav 
Dormition Cathedral in Poltava
Holy Protection Cathedral in Rivne
Holy Resurrection Co-Cathedral in Rivne 
Holy Resurrection Cathedral in Sumy
Cathedral of the Blessed Virgin in Ternopil 
Cathedral of the Transfiguration in Kremenets 
Cathedral of Candlemas in Kherson
Cathedral of St. Andrew in Khmelnytskyi 
Holy Trinity Cathedral in Cherkassy
Cathedral of St. Paraskevi of Serbia in Chernivtsi
St. Catherine Cathedral in Chernihiv

Cathedrals of the Catholic Church

Cathedrals of the Catholic Church in Ukraine in full communion with the Pope in Rome. In this country there are at least 34 catholic cathedrals with 4 rites:

Latin Rite
 Cathedral of Sts. Peter and Paul in Kamianets-Podilskyi
 Cathedral of the Assumption Blessed Virgin Mary in Kharkiv
 Co-cathedral of the Merciful Father in Zaporizhia
 Cathedral of Holy Wisdom in Zhytomyr
 Co-Cathedral of St. Alexander in Kyiv
 Cathedral of Sts. Peter and Paul in Lutsk
 Cathedral of St. Martin of Tours in Mukacheve
 Cathedral of the Blessed Virgin Mary in Odesa

Ukrainian Rite
Cathedrals of the Ukrainian Greek Catholic Church:
Cathedral of Sts. Peter and Paul in Chortkiv
Cathedral of the Virgin of Mercy in Donetsk
Cathedral of the Resurrection of Our Saviour in Ivano-Frankivsk
Cathedral of St. Michael in Kolomyia
Co-Cathedral of the Assumption of the Blessed Virgin Mary in Chernivtsi
Cathedral of the Nativity of the Theotokos in Lutsk
 St. George's Cathedral in Lviv
 Cathedral of the Dormition of the Holy Mother of God in Odesa
Cathedral of the Holy Trinity in Drohobych
Cathedral of Sts. Ann, Peter and Paul in Sokal
Cathedral of the Assumption of the Blessed Virgin in Stryi
 Cathedral of the Immaculate Conception of the Holy Mother of God in Ternopil

Armenian Rite
Armenian Cathedral of the Assumption of Mary in Lviv

Ruthenian Rite
Cathedral of the Exaltation of the Cross in Mukacheve
	Co-Cathedral of the Assumption of the Blessed Virgin Mary in Mukacheve

See also

List of cathedrals
Christianity in Ukraine

References

 
Cathedrals
Ukraine
Cathedrals